Armstrong Elementary School may refer to:

In the United States:
 Armstrong Elementary School (California), part of Pomona Unified School District, in Pomona, California
 Armstrong Elementary School (Minnesota), in Cottage Grove, Minnesota 
 Armstrong Elementary School (North Carolina), in Cumberland County, North Carolina 
 Armstrong Elementary School (South Carolina), in Greenville County, South Carolina 
 Armstrong Elementary School (Highland Park, Texas), in Highland Park, Texas
 Armstrong Elementary School (Sachse, Texas), part of Garland Independent School District, in Sachse, Texas
 Armstrong Elementary School (Fairfax County, Virginia), in Fairfax County, Virginia 
 Armstrong Elementary School (Lynchburg, Virginia), listed on the National Register of Historic Places (NRHP)

In Canada:
 Armstrong Elementary School, part of the School District 41 Burnaby, in Burnaby, British Columbia

See also 
 Armstrong School (Illinois), part of School District 54, in Hoffman Estates, Illinois  
 Armstrong Elementary School (Texas), part of South San Antonio ISD, in Bexar County, Texas 
 Neil Armstrong Elementary School (California), part of San Ramon Valley Unified School District, in San Ramon, California 
 Neil Armstrong Elementary School (New York), part of Gates Chili Central School District, in Monroe County, New York 
 Neil Armstrong Elementary School (Pennsylvania), part of Scranton School District (Pennsylvania), in Lackawanna County, Pennsylvania 
 Neil Armstrong Elementary School (Florida), part of Charlotte County Public Schools, Charlotte County, Florida 
 Neil Armstrong Elementary School (Iowa), part of Bettendorf Community School District, Bettendorf, Iowa 
 Neil Armstrong Elementary School (Illinois), part of Elementary School District 159, Cook County, Illinois